Patrick Ifeanyi Ubah  (born 3 September 1971), is a Nigerian Politician, entrepreneur and businessman currently serving as Senator representing Anambra South Senatorial District in the Nigerian senate. He is the CEO of Capital Oil (CCO), which he founded in 2001.

Childhood and education

Ifeanyi was born as the first son of seven children to Mr. & Mrs. Alphonsus Ubah in Otolo, one of the four quarters of Nnewi in Anambra State, Nigeria. Due to the inability of his parents to cater for the educational and material needs of their children, Ifeanyi dropped out of Premiere academy, Lugbe, Abuja to learn trade at a young age. He has attended several local and international business courses and seminars in leadership and business management.

Business

Ifeanyi became an exporter of motor tyres and spare parts majorly in West Africa including Ghana, Sierra Leone, Liberia and DR Congo before he expanded his business ventures in some countries in Europe including Belgium and the United Kingdom.

In 2001, he founded Capital Oil and Gas Limited. He is the founder of The Authority Newspaper, a Nigerian daily newspaper and also the owner of Ifeanyi Ubah F.C., a football club in the Nigeria Premier League, following its purchase as Gabros International Football Club.

Politics
In 2014, Ifeanyi Ubah lost at the 2014 Anambra gubernatorial election under the platform of the Labour Party. On 24 February 2019, Ifeanyi Ubah was declared winner of the Anambra South Senatorial elections under the platform of the Young Progressive Party (YPP).

Personal life
Ifeanyi Ubah is married to Uchenna Ubah, a Business Administration graduate from Ahmadu Bello University in Nigeria, with whom he has 5 children. He also runs a foundation which is named after him; Ifeanyi Ubah Foundation.

Attempted assassination 
In September 2022, Ifeanyi Ubah was while on his way to Nnewi was attacked by gunmen in Enugwu-Ukwu in Anambra State - his convoy was shot at; at least 5 persons, including 2 policemen, were killed. Uba survived as the vehicle he was riding in was bulletproof.

References

External links

1971 births
Living people
People from Nnewi
Igbo people
Igbo businesspeople
Nigerian Roman Catholics
Nigerian businesspeople in the oil industry
Nigerian billionaires